Claudio Matías Kranevitter (born 21 May 1993) is an Argentine professional footballer who plays as a defensive midfielder for Argentine Primera División club River Plate.

Club career

River Plate
Born in San Miguel de Tucumán, Kranevitter started his career at San Martín de Tucumán's youth setup, but left the club at the age of 12 due to his family's poor financial situation. In 2007, aged 14, he joined River Plate after impressing on a trial.

After being initially assigned to the reserves, Kranevitter was also a member of the under-20s during its U-20 Copa Libertadores winning campaign in 2012. On 2 December of that year he made his first team debut, coming on as a second-half substitute in a 1–0 home win against Lanús.

Kranevitter was promoted to the main squad by new manager Ramón Díaz. Initially a backup to Leonardo Ponzio and Cristian Ledesma, he appeared in 30 matches during the 2013–14 season, 16 as a starter, overcoming the latter midway through the campaign.

In September 2014, already a regular starter, Kranevitter suffered a metatarsus injury, being ruled out until the following year. In October, however, he trained with crutches and returned to action in late November, being utilized in both legs of 2014 Copa Sudamericana Finals.

Atlético Madrid
On 25 August 2015, La Liga side Atlético Madrid reached an agreement with River for the sale of Kranevitter, for a rumoured fee of €8 million. He was officially announced three days later, being immediately loaned back to River until December.

Assigned to the main squad in January 2016, Kranevitter was handed the  8 shirt. He made his debut in the main category on 14 February, coming on as a substitute for goalscorer Fernando Torres in a 1–0 away win against Getafe CF.

Sevilla (loan)
On 7 July 2016, Kranevitter was loaned to fellow top tier club Sevilla FC, in a season-long deal.

Zenit
On 8 August 2017, he moved to the Russian Premier League club FC Zenit Saint Petersburg, signing a 4-year contract. He joined his former River Plate teammates Sebastián Driussi and Emanuel Mammana at the club. On 24 January 2020 Zenit confirmed that Kranevitter left the club.

Monterrey
On 26 January 2020, Kranevitter joined Liga MX club Monterrey.

International career

Kranevitter represented Argentina at under-20 level in 2013 South American Youth Football Championship. He appeared in three matches, all as a starter, as his side was knocked out in the group stage.

On 24 August 2015, Kranevitter was called up to the main squad for two friendlies against Bolivia and Mexico as a replacement to injured Lucas Biglia. He made his full international debut on 4 September, starting in a 7–0 routing of the former at the BBVA Compass Stadium in Houston.

Kranevitter was nominated in the 2016 Copa América squad and was part of the Argentine side that ran to the final. He was subbed on in the 57th minute of the final against Chile, which Chile won 4–2 on penalties.

Style of play
Mainly a defensive midfielder, Kranevitter excels at breaking up play, shielding the defense and dictating the tempo and speed the team plays at. Although not very physical, he is known for his usually clean and well-timed tackles and his good defensive positioning.

Kranevitter is often compared to Javier Mascherano, due to both being River Plate youth graduates and having the same playing style.

Personal life
Kranevitter also played golf during his youth, and stated that he "would be a golfer if he hadn't chosen football".

Career statistics

Club

Notes

International

Honours

River Plate
Argentine Primera División: 2014 Final
Copa Sudamericana: 2014
Recopa Sudamericana: 2015
Copa Libertadores: 2015
Suruga Bank Championship: 2015
U-20 Copa Libertadores: 2012

Zenit
Russian Premier League: 2018–19, 2019–20
Russian Cup: 2019–20

Monterrey
 Copa MX: 2019–20
 CONCACAF Champions League: 2021

Argentina
Copa América runner-up: 2016

Individual
Copa Libertadores Team of the Year: 2015

References

External links

1993 births
Living people
Sportspeople from San Miguel de Tucumán
Argentine people of Volga German descent
Argentine footballers
Association football midfielders
Argentine Primera División players
Club Atlético River Plate footballers
La Liga players
Atlético Madrid footballers
Sevilla FC players
Argentina youth international footballers
Argentina international footballers
Copa América Centenario players
Argentine expatriate footballers
Argentine expatriate sportspeople in Spain
Expatriate footballers in Spain
FC Zenit Saint Petersburg players
Expatriate footballers in Russia
Russian Premier League players